The John Conkin and Clara Layton Harlin House, also known as the Uncle Johnny's and the Old Harlin House, is a historic home located at Gainesville, Ozark County, Missouri.  It was built in 1912, and is a -story, American Foursquare style frame dwelling.  It sits on a limestone foundation and has a pyramidal roof with hipped roof dormers. It features a one-story wraparound porch with curved corners.

It was listed on the National Register of Historic Places in 2002.

References 

Houses on the National Register of Historic Places in Missouri
Houses completed in 1912
Buildings and structures in Ozark County, Missouri
National Register of Historic Places in Ozark County, Missouri